Peter Webb may refer to:

 Peter Webb (rugby union) (1854–1920), New Zealand rugby union player
 Peter Webb (Irish cricketer) (born 1932), Irish cricketer
 Peter Webb (art dealer) (1933–2019), New Zealand art dealer
 Peter Webb (rower) (born 1940), British rower
 Peter Webb (politician) (born 1953), Australian politician
 Peter Webb (New Zealand cricketer) (born 1957), New Zealand cricketer